The following is a list of notable deaths in July 2017.

Entries for each day are listed alphabetically by surname. A typical entry lists information in the following sequence:
 Name, age, country of citizenship at birth, subsequent country of citizenship (if applicable), what subject was noted for, cause of death (if known), and reference.

July 2017

1
Ibra Agbo, 30, Cameroonian-born Equatoguinean football player and coach.
Aleshia Brevard, 79, American transgender actress and author, pulmonary fibrosis.
Norman Dorsen, 86, American civil rights activist, president of the American Civil Liberties Union (1977–1991), complications from a stroke.
Myles Frechette, 81, American diplomat, United States Ambassador to Cameroon (1983-1987) and to Colombia (1994-1997).
Paul Hardin III, 86, American academic administrator (Wofford College, Drew University, UNC), amyotrophic lateral sclerosis.
Joseph Keke, 89, Beninese politician.
Ernest Krings, 96, Belgian judge.
Stevie Ryan, 33, American actress and comedian (Stevie TV), suicide by hanging.
Ayan Sadakov, 55, Bulgarian footballer (Lokomotiv Plovdiv, national team), amyotrophic lateral sclerosis.
Richard Gilbert Scott, 93, British architect.
Nilu Doma Sherpa, 32, Nepali film director, heart attack.
Sergio Sorrentino, 92, Italian Olympic sailor (1956, 1964).
Stephen Tindale, 54, British environmentalist, suicide.
Orri Vigfússon, 74, Icelandic environmentalist, lung cancer.
Heathcote Williams, 75, British author and actor (City of Ember), kidney failure.

2
Ataullah Behmanesh, 94, Iranian wrestler and sports journalist, stroke.
Tony Bianchi, 65, British author.
Jack Collom, 85, American poet, essayist and poetry teacher.
Billy Cook, 77, British-born Australian footballer.
Alfred G. Fischer, 96, German-born American geologist.
Ron Fuller, 80, British artist and toy designer.
Ryke Geerd Hamer, 82, German physician, charlatan and conspiracy theorist.
Horace Harned, 96, American politician.
Smith Hart, 68, American-Canadian professional wrestler (Stampede, WWC, IWE), prostate cancer.
Abiola Irele, 81, Nigerian literary critic.
Gulab Khandelwal, 93, Indian poet.
Minos Kyriakou, 75, Greek media and shipping magnate, heart attack.
Vladimir Malaniuk, 59, Ukrainian chess grandmaster.
John McCormick, 80, Scottish footballer (Crystal Palace, Aberdeen), dementia.
Nirupam, 70, Indian diplomat, Permanent Representative of India to the United Nations (2004–2009).
Bob Perry, 82, American baseball player (Los Angeles Angels).
Marjorie Rice, 94, American amateur mathematician.
Chris Roberts, 73, German singer and actor, lung cancer.
Bert Rossi, 94, English gangster.
Michael Sandberg, Baron Sandberg, 90, British banker and life peer, Chairman of HSBC (1977–1986).
Mel Shaw, 70, American racing driver, car crash.
Madhukar Toradmal, 84, Indian actor, kidney failure.
David W. Vincent, 67, American baseball author, official scorer and statistician (Washington Nationals, SABR, Retrosheet), stomach cancer.
Tatiana Zatulovskaya, 81, Soviet-born Israeli chess player, Woman Grandmaster (1976), stroke.
Fay Zwicky, 83, Australian poet.

3
Ângelo Angelin, 82, Brazilian politician, Governor of Rondônia (1985–1987).
Tom Blom, 70, Dutch radio and television presenter (Te land, ter zee en in de lucht).
Manlio De Angelis, 82, Italian actor and voice actor.
Henrique Medina Carreira, 85, Portuguese jurist and financier, Minister of Finance (1976–1978).
José Luis Cuevas, 83, Mexican artist.
Spencer Johnson, 78, American author (Who Moved My Cheese?), complications from pancreatic cancer.
Theodore Kanavas, 56, American politician, member of the Wisconsin Senate (2001–2011), cancer.
John Ssebaana Kizito, 82, Ugandan politician, Mayor of Kampala (1999–2006).
George Levinger, 90, American psychologist.
Sandy Mactaggart, 89, Scottish-born Canadian property developer and academic, Chancellor of the University of Alberta (1983–1994).
Lloyd Noel, 83, Grenadian attorney, Attorney General (1979–1980).
Joe Robinson, 90, British actor (Diamonds Are Forever, The Loneliness of the Long Distance Runner, Thor and the Amazon Women).
Rudy Rotta, 66, Italian blues guitarist and singer.
Solvi Stubing, 76, German actress (Nude per l'assassino).
Maitama Sule, 87, Nigerian politician and diplomat, Permanent Representative to the United Nations (1979–2017).
Jean-Jacques Susini, 83, French militant, co-founder of the Organisation Armée Secrète.
Paolo Villaggio, 84, Italian writer and actor (Ugo Fantozzi, The Voice of the Moon, Ciao, Professore!), complications from diabetes.

4
Bryan Avery, 73, British architect.
John Blackwell, 43, American funk and jazz drummer (Prince), brain tumor.
Aldine Calacurcio, 89, American baseball player (AAGPBL).
Chen Xuejun, 98, Chinese physicist, Chinese Academy of Sciences.
Gene Conley, 86, American baseball (Milwaukee Braves, Philadelphia Phillies) and basketball player (Boston Celtics), heart failure.
Ji-Tu Cumbuka, 77, American actor (Roots, Blacula, Mandingo), cancer.
Maria d'Apparecida, 91, Brazilian opera singer.
Daniil Granin, 98, Russian author.
John S. Palmore, 99, American judge, Chief Justice of the Kentucky Supreme Court (1966, 1973, 1977–1982).
Ntuthuko Radebe, 22, South African footballer (Eupen), traffic collision.
Carol Lee Scott, 74, English actress (Grotbags).
*Shen Panwen, 100, Chinese chemist (Academy of Sciences).
Afërdita Veveçka Priftaj, 69, Albanian metal physicist and academic (Polytechnic University of Tirana), member of Academy of Sciences of Albania (since 2008).
Masatoshi Yoshino, 89, Japanese geographer and climatologist.
David Yewdall, 66, American sound editor (The Thing, The Fifth Element, Escape from New York), pancreatic cancer.

5
John Harland Bryant, 92, American physician and public health pioneer.
Keith Conners, 84, American psychologist, heart failure.
Chris de Freitas, 68, Trinidadian-born New Zealand climatologist, cancer.
Max Gergel, 96, American chemist.
Pierre Henry, 89, French composer.
Tim Hollier, 69–70, British musician and publisher, complications of surgery.
Paul Hollingdale, 79, British radio personality (BBC Radio 2).
John Karlsen, 97, New Zealand actor (Bill & Ted's Excellent Adventure).
John McKenzie, 91, Scottish footballer (Partick Thistle, Dumbarton, national team).
Joachim Meisner, 83, German Roman Catholic cardinal, Bishop of Berlin (1980–1988) and Archbishop of Cologne (1988–2014).
Joaquín Navarro-Valls, 80, Spanish journalist, Director of the Holy See Press Office (1984–2006).
William Clark O'Kelley, 87, American federal judge, U.S. District Court for the Northern District of Georgia (1970–1996), cancer.
Irina Ratushinskaya, 63, Russian poet, cancer.
Willi Reschke, 95, German Luftwaffe ace.
John A. Robertson, 74, American law scholar and bioethicist.
John Rodriguez, 80, Guyanese-born Canadian politician, mayor of Greater Sudbury (2006–2010) and member of the House of Commons (1972–1980, 1984–1993).
Tinners Way, 27, American Thoroughbred racehorse, Pacific Classic Stakes winner (1994, 1995), euthanized.
Andrzej Trzebski, 89, Polish physiologist.
Mark Wilkinson, 66, English furniture designer, pancreatic cancer.
Roger Wootton, 73, English aeronautical engineer and balloonist.

6
Michel Aurillac, 88, French lawyer, politician and author, member of the National Assembly (1978–1981, 1986).
David Alonso López, 39, Mexican boxer, shot.
Håkan Carlqvist, 63, Swedish motocross racer, world champion (1979, 1983), complications from a brain hemorrhage.
Willie Stevenson Glanton, 95, American lawyer and politician, member of the Iowa House of Representatives (1965–1966).
Giovanni Bernardo Gremoli, 91, Italian-born Emirati Roman Catholic prelate, Vicar Apostolic of Arabia (1975–2005).
Robert Grodt, 28, American volunteer medic (Occupy Wall Street, People's Protection Units).
George Hansen, 83, Canadian football player (Calgary Stampeders).
Joan Holderness, 84, American baseball player (All-American Girls Professional Baseball League).
Nancy Jeffett, 88, American Hall of Fame women's tennis promoter.
Melvyn "Deacon" Jones, 73, American blues musician.
Landrú, 94, Argentine political cartoonist.
Joan Boocock Lee, 95, British-born American actress (Spider-Man, Fantastic Four, X-Men: Apocalypse) and model, complications from a stroke.
William Morva, 35, American convicted murderer, executed by lethal injection.
Shu Nakajima, 69, Japanese actor (47 Ronin, The Emperor in August, Kagemusha), fall.
Paolo Piva, 67, Italian architect.
Thomas E. Sanders, 63, American production designer and art director (Saving Private Ryan, Braveheart, Crimson Peak), cancer.
Heinz Schneiter, 82, Swiss footballer (national team).
Arun Kumar Sharma, 92, Indian cell biologist.
Galip Tekin, 59, Turkish comic book artist, heart attack.
Frederick Tuckman, 95, German-born British politician, MEP for Leicester. (1979–1989).
Diane Von Hoffman, 55, American professional wrestler (USWA), complications from knee surgery.
Ken Wimshurst, 79, English footballer (Bristol City F.C.).

7
Ray Barnard, 84, English footballer (Middlesbrough).
Jean-Pierre Bernard, 84, French actor (The Eiger Sanction).
Pierrette Bloch, 89, French-born Swiss artist.
Chó do Guri, 58, Angolan author.
Danny Daniels, 92, American dancer and choreographer (The Tap Dance Kid).
Léonce Deprez, 89, French footballer.
Pedro Juan Figueroa, 66, Puerto Rican actor (Dios los cria) and radio host, pancreatic cancer.
Dorothy Fratt, 93, American painter.
Egbert de Graeff, 80, Dutch Olympic hockey player (1960).
Claude Hall, 83, American journalist and writer (Billboard).
Werner Hamacher, 68–69, German literary critic.
Shlomo Helbrans, 55, Israeli rabbi and sect leader (Lev Tahor), drowned.
Diego E. Hernández, 83, American military officer, Parkinson's disease.
Johnson Kendrick, 25, Brazilian footballer (Al-Gharafa), shot.
Georgy Koshlakov, 81, Russian-born Tajik politician and scientist.
Daniel Lewis, 92, American conductor.
Pam McConnell, 71, Canadian politician, member of the Toronto City Council (since 1998).
Tony Moore, 69, English footballer (Chester City, Chesterfield, Grimsby Town).
Egil Monn-Iversen, 89, Norwegian composer and pianist.
James B. Nutter Sr., 89, American mortgage lender (James B. Nutter & Company), philanthropist (Children's Mercy Hospital) and power broker (Missouri).
Ian Posgate, 85, English insurance underwriter.
Marina Ratner, 78, Russian-American mathematician.
Lala Rukh, 69, Pakistani women's rights activist and artist, cancer.
Kenneth Silverman, 81, American biographer, Pulitzer Prize winner (1985), lung cancer.
Alan Sisitsky, 75, American lawyer and politician.

8
Evan Armstrong, 74, British boxer.
Siri Austeng, 73, Norwegian politician.
David Bishop, 75, Canadian politician, MLA for York North (1974-1987).
Gustavo Ehlers, 92, Chilean Olympic athlete.
Nelsan Ellis, 39, American actor (True Blood, Get on Up, Elementary), complications from heart failure.
Richard Findlay, 73, Scottish broadcaster.
Gour Ghosh, 77, Indian cricketer.
Sterling Hambrook, 82, Canadian politician.
Don Johns, 79, Canadian ice hockey player (New York Rangers).
Bob Lubbers, 95, American cartoonist (Tarzan).
Elsa Martinelli, 82, Italian actress (Donatella, Hatari!, The V.I.P.s) and fashion model, cancer.
Joseph Ole Nkaissery, 67, Kenyan politician, MP (2002–2014), heart attack.
Roy Richards, 33, Vincentian footballer (national team), shot.
Jacques Vien, 85, Canadian politician.
Seiji Yokoyama, 82, Japanese composer (Saint Seiya, Magical Taluluto, Space Pirate Captain Harlock), pneumonia.

9
Susanna Au-yeung, 63, Hong Kong actress (The Return of the Condor Heroes), lung cancer.
Shaun Brogan, 73, British army officer.
Gene Brucker, 92, American historian.
Wally Burr, 91, American voice actor and director (The Transformers, Jem, Spider-Man).
Naresh Chandra, 82, Indian diplomat, Ambassador to the United States (1996–2001), Governor of Gujarat (1995–1996), multiple organ failure.
Ed Crawford, 82, American football player (New York Giants), Alzheimer's disease.
Clare Douglas, 73, British film editor (United 93, Tinker Tailor Soldier Spy, Bloody Sunday).
Ilya Glazunov, 87, Russian painter.
John McKnight, 86, Northern Irish Gaelic football player (Armagh GAA).
Anton Nossik, 51, Russian writer and internet entrepreneur, heart attack.
Neal Patterson, 67, American businessman (Cerner, Sporting Kansas City), cancer.
Paquita Rico, 87, Spanish singer and actress (Let's Make the Impossible!, The Balcony of the Moon, Where Are You Going, Alfonso XII?).
Bob Rogers, 83, American Olympic rower.
Vappu Salonen, 88, Finnish Olympic gymnast (1952).
Sumita Sanyal, 71, Indian actress (Anand), heart failure.
Jack Shaheen, 81, American media critic, author and Arab tolerance campaigner (Reel Bad Arabs).
Adolfo Taylhardat, 83, Venezuelan diplomat, President of the United Nations Security Council (1993).
Robert Vigouroux, 94, French politician, Mayor of Marseille (1986–1995), Senator (1989–1998).
David Wilstein, 89, American real estate developer.

10
Peter Alfond, 65, American investor (Berkshire Hathaway) and philanthropist (Maine Medical Center), malaria.
Jim Bush, 90, American Hall of Fame track and field coach (UCLA), prostate cancer.
Augustin Buzura, 78, Romanian writer and journalist.
Peter Härtling, 83, German writer and poet.
Miguel Luna Hernández, 63, Mexican politician.
John M. Jacobus Jr., 89, American art historian.
Eugène Koffi Kouamé, 29, Ivorian footballer, heart attack.
Prudence Nobantu Mabele, 46, South African HIV activist, pneumonia.
Marama Martin, 87, New Zealand television and radio personality (Family Favourites).
Emma Mashinini, 87, South African trade unionist.
Leonardo Maugeri, 53, Italian oil and gas expert.
Martin Molony, 91, Irish jockey.
Isabelle Sadoyan, 89, French actress (Les fantômes du chapelier, Mayrig, Irreplaceable).
Paitoon Smuthranond, 86, Thai Olympian.
Mangesh Tendulkar, 82, Indian cartoonist.
Elvira Vigna, 69, Brazilian writer, cancer.

11
Nicholas Biwott, 77, Kenyan agricultural businessman and politician, MP (1979–2007).
George W. BonDurant, 101, American preacher and academic administrator.
Dianne Brushett, 74, Canadian politician, MP (1993–1997), leukemia.
Bill Chambers, 86, American basketball player and coach (College of William & Mary), Parkinson's disease.
Joseph Fire Crow, 58, American Cheyenne flutist, idiopathic pulmonary fibrosis.
Jeremy Dale Roberts, 83, English composer, prostate cancer.
Jean-Claude Fignolé, 76, Haitian author.
Abdul Rahman Ghaleb, Pakistani militant, air strike.
Fikret Hakan, 83, Turkish actor (Revenge of the Snakes, Battal Gazi Destanı), lung cancer.
Abdullah Hayayei, 36, Emirati Paralympic athlete, head trauma.
Evzen Kolar, 67, Czech film producer (Never Say Never Again, Surf Ninjas, Inferno).
Denis Mack Smith, 97, British historian.
Keisuke Sagawa, 80, Japanese actor (Barom-1), heart attack.
Éva Schubert, 86, Hungarian actress.
Pakkiriswamy Chandra Sekharan, 83, Indian forensic expert.
Luigi Ferdinando Tagliavini, 87, Italian organist, harpsichordist, musicologist and composer.
Gert Trinklein, 68, German footballer (Eintracht Frankfurt), leukemia.
Imran Usmanov, 64, Russian Chechen folk singer.
Buddy Wolfe, 76, American professional wrestler (AWA, NWA, WWWF).

12
Chuck Blazer, 72, American soccer administrator, informant for the 2015 FIFA corruption case, colorectal cancer.
Gerrit Braks, 84, Dutch politician, Minister of Agriculture, Nature and Fisheries (1980–1981, 1982–1990) and Education and Science (1989), Senate President (2001–2003).
Tommy Carberry, 75, Irish jockey.
S. Allen Counter, 73, American neurophysiologist.
Joe Fields, 88, American record producer.
Sam Glanzman, 92, American comics artist (Captain Willy Schultz).
Liviu Giurgian, 54, Romanian hurdler, stroke.
Thomas L. Haskell, 78, American historian.
Allan Hunter, 94, New Zealand rugby union player (Hawke's Bay).
Tamara Miansarova, 86, Ukrainian-born Russian pop singer ("May There Always Be Sunshine").
Ray Phiri, 70, South African jazz singer and guitarist, lung cancer.
Phillip Playford, 85, Australian geologist.
Abd al-Majid al-Rafei, 90, Lebanese politician, MP (1972–1989).
Tod Sloan, 89, Canadian ice hockey player (Toronto Maple Leafs, Chicago Blackhawks).

13
Abdul Rahman bin Abdulaziz Al Saud, 86, Saudi prince.
Américo Amorim, 82, Portuguese cork businessman (Corticeira Amorim).
Charles Bachman, 92, American computer scientist.
Keith Baird, 94, Barbadian-born American linguist.
John Bernecker, 33, American stunt performer (Logan, The Hunger Games, This is the End), blunt force trauma.
Paritat Bulbon, 46, Thai racing driver, suicide by gunshot.
John Dalby, 88, English composer, singer and pianist.
Vince Farrar, 70, English rugby league player (Featherstone Rovers, Sheffield Eagles, Hull).
Giovanni Franzoni, 88, Italian writer and theologian.
Okay Gönensin, 66, Turkish journalist.
Johanna Grund, 82, German politician.
Anwarul Haque, 61, Bangladeshi judge, Supreme Court (since 2012).
Simon Holmes, 54, Australian musician (The Hummingbirds).
Giannis Kalatzis, 74, Greek singer.
Egil Kapstad, 76, Norwegian jazz pianist, arranger and composer.
Héctor Lechuga, 88, Mexican comedian, actor and radio personality (México 2000), heart attack.
*Liu Xiaobo, 61, Chinese writer and human rights activist, Nobel Peace Prize laureate (2010), multiple organ failure due to liver cancer.
Joaquim Molins i Amat, 72, Spanish politician, member of the Congress of Deputies (1979–1986, 1993–2000) and Parliament of Catalonia (1988–1993).
Andrews Otutu Obaseki, 91, Nigerian judge, Supreme Court (1975–1991).
Gertrude Poe, 101, American journalist (Laurel Leader).
Carl E. Reichardt, 86, American banking executive (Wells Fargo).
Wolfgang Schmitt, 78, German Olympic boxer (1964).
Derek Shiel, 78, Irish painter, sculptor, writer, and film-maker.
Olive Yang, 91, Burmese opium warlady.

14
Mahi Beamer, 88, American singer.
Prunella Briance, 91, British natural childbirth campaigner.
Wm. Theodore de Bary, 97, American sinologist.
Paul Ferreri, 69, Italian-Australian boxer.
Ross Giudice, 93, American basketball coach (San Francisco Dons).
Anne Golon, 95, French author.
Julia Hartwig, 95, Polish writer and translator.
Bert Hill, 87, English footballer (Colchester United F.C.).
William "Hootie" Johnson, 86, American banker and sports administrator (Augusta National Golf Club), member of the South Carolina House of Representatives (1957–1958).
Maryam Mirzakhani, 40, Iranian mathematician and academic, Fields Medalist (2014), breast cancer.
Roland Moyle, 89, British politician, MP for Lewisham North (1966–1974) and Lewisham East (1974–1983).
Clara (Cuqui) Nicola, 91, Cuban guitarist, professor and pedagogue, cardiorespiratory arrest.
Kosie Pretorius, 81, Namibian politician, MP (1990–2005).
Pedro Richter Prada, 96, Peruvian politician, Prime Minister (1979–1980).

15
Anne Buttimer, 78, Irish geographer, president of International Geographical Union (2000–2004).
Wesley Carr, 75, British Anglican priest, Dean of Westminster (1997–2006).
Warrick L. Carter, 75, American music educator and executive.
Agostino Cilardo, 69, Italian Arabist.
Michael Cooper, 78, British economist.
Justine Damond, 40, Australian woman murdered by a Minneapolis Police officer.
Josef Hamerl, 86, Austrian footballer (Wiener SK).
William Hoyland, 73, English actor (Bill Brand, Hellboy, For Your Eyes Only), stomach cancer.
Martha Kyrle, 100, Austrian physician.
Davie Laing, 92, Scottish footballer (Heart of Midlothian).
Martin Landau, 89, American actor (Ed Wood, Mission: Impossible, Crimes and Misdemeanors), Oscar winner (1995), abdominal hemorrhage.
Louise Merzeau, 53, French academic.
Babe Parilli, 87, American football player and coach (Boston Patriots, Denver Dynamite, New York Jets), multiple myeloma.
Vjekoslav Vojo Radoičić, 86, Croatian painter, sculptor, printmaker and stage designer.
Plaiter Reyes, 46, Dominican Republic Olympic weightlifter.
Vladimir Tolokonnikov, 74, Kazakh-Russian actor.
Bob Wolff, 96, American sportscaster (Washington Senators).

16
Nazem Amine, 90, Lebanese Olympic wrestler.
Carlos Aro, 77, Argentine Olympic boxer (1960).
Trevor Baxter, 84, British actor (Doctor Who, Maelstrom, Sky Captain and the World of Tomorrow) and playwright.
Nar Bahadur Bhandari, 76, Indian politician, Chief Minister of Sikkim (1979–1984, 1985–1994), cardiac arrest following spinal surgery.
Jerry Bird, 83, American basketball player (Kentucky Wildcats, New York Knicks).
Joan Calabrese, 77, American fashion designer, uterine cancer.
Régis Gizavo, 58, Malagasy accordionist.
Kim Hammond, 72, American judge (Seventh Judicial Circuit Court of Florida) and football player (Florida State Seminoles).
Wanda Lesisz, 92, Polish WWII resistance fighter.
Tom Mitchell, 72, American football player (Baltimore Colts), lung cancer and diabetes.
Zhibek Nukeeva, 22, Kyrgyz beauty queen, Miss Kyrgyzstan (2013), chondrosarcoma.
George A. Romero, 77, American-Canadian film director and screenwriter (Night of the Living Dead, Dawn of the Dead, Creepshow), lung cancer.
Clancy Sigal, 91, American author and screenwriter (Frida).
Cliff Whiting, 81, New Zealand Māori muralist, carver and teacher.
Wilfried, 67, Austrian singer ("Lisa Mona Lisa"), cancer.
Siegfried Wolf, 91, German footballer.

17
Harvey Atkin, 74, Canadian actor (Cagney & Lacey, Meatballs, Law & Order: Special Victims Unit), cancer.
Evan Helmuth, 40, American actor (The Devil Inside, Fever Pitch, Jobs), complications from a stroke.
George Hill, 79, British-born New Zealand agronomist.
John Potter, 93, British SOE agent and chemist.
K. N. Shankara, 72, Indian space scientist.
Hersh Wolch, 77, Canadian lawyer (David Milgaard).
Marie-Josèphe Yoyotte, 87, French film and television editor and actress.

18
Gustavo Alessandri Valdés, 88, Chilean lawyer and politician, Mayor of Central Commune of Santiago de Chile (1987–1989) and MP (1961–1965, 1969–1971, 1998–2002).
José Bragato, 101, Italian-born Argentine cellist, composer, conductor and arranger (Teatro Colón).
Ben's Cat, 11, American racehorse, euthanized.
Jean Murrell Capers, 104, American judge.
François Dehez, 85, Belgian Olympic fencer (1956, 1960).
Delia Graff Fara, 48, American philosopher.
Max Gallo, 85, French writer, historian and politician.
Mauno Hartman, 87, Finnish sculptor.
Shigeaki Hinohara, 105, Japanese physician (St. Luke's International Hospital).
Val Jeffery, 82, Australian politician, ACT MLA (2016).
André Lafargue, 100, French journalist (Le Parisien libéré).
Ian Mason, 75, New Zealand cricketer (Wellington).
Herbert Needleman, 89, American pediatrician and medical researcher.
Pat O'Donahue, 86, American football player (San Francisco 49ers, Green Bay Packers).
Andrew Paulson, 59, American executive (SUP Media), lung cancer.
John Rheinecker, 38, American baseball player (Texas Rangers), suicide.
José Luis Sánchez Paraíso, 74, Spanish Olympic sprinter (1968, 1972, 1976).
Dawn Seymour, 100, American air force pilot.
Chris Sherwin, 55, English veterinary biologist.
Red West, 81, American actor and stuntman (Walking Tall, Road House, The Wild Wild West), aortic aneurysm.

19
Torvild Aakvaag, 90, Norwegian petroleum executive (Norsk Hydro).
María Amuchástegui, 64, Argentine television fitness presenter, ballerina and singer, stroke and lung cancer.
Uma Bhende, 72, Indian actress and producer (Bhalu), heart disease.
Miguel Blesa, 69, Spanish banker, Chairman of Caja Madrid (1996–2009), suicide by gunshot.
Jake Butcher, 81, American banker and politician, financier of the 1982 World's Fair.
Karel Franta, 89, Czech painter and illustrator, heart attack.
Blaoui Houari, 91, Algerian singer and songwriter.
Charles Weston Houck, 84, American jurist, U.S. District Court for the District of South Carolina (1979–2003).
David E. H. Jones, 79, British chemist and author.
Jordin Kare, 60, American aerospace engineer, complications from heart valve surgery.
Évelyne Prouvost, 78, French businesswoman and magazine executive (Marie Claire), fall.
Ralph Regula, 92, American politician, member of the U.S. House of Representatives from Ohio's 16th congressional district (1973–2009).
Fenwick Smith, 69, American flutist (Boston Symphony Orchestra).
Mary Turner, 79, Irish-born British trade unionist.
Joe Walters, 79, Scottish footballer (Clyde).
Barbara Weldens, 35, French singer, cardiac arrest.
Graham Wood, 45, Australian jazz pianist, bile duct cancer.

20
Chester Bennington, 41, American singer and songwriter (Linkin Park, Dead by Sunrise, Stone Temple Pilots), suicide by hanging.
David R. Brink, 97, American attorney, president of the American Bar Association (1981–1982).
Marco Aurélio Garcia, 76, Brazilian politician, heart attack.
Grand Armee, 18, Australian racehorse.
Stephen Haseler, 75, British academic.
Andrea Jürgens, 50, German schlager singer, kidney failure.
Jesse Kalisher, 55, American photographer, cancer.
Bernhard Kempa, 96, German handball player and coach (Göppingen).
Kenneth Jay Lane, 85, American costume jewelry designer.
John McCluskey, Baron McCluskey, 88, Scottish lawyer, judge and life peer, Solicitor General for Scotland (1974–1979).
Ben Portis, 56, Canadian artist and curator, traffic collision.
Pudsey, 11, British performing dog (Britain's Got Talent, Pudsey: The Movie, Mr Stink), blood cancer.
Joseph Rago, 34, American journalist (The Wall Street Journal), sarcoidosis.
Claude Rich, 88, French actor (Je t'aime, je t'aime).
Robbie Savage, 50, Namibian football mascot, diabetic ketoacidosis.
Deborah Schiffrin, 56, American linguist.
Peter Sears, 80, American poet.
Jonathan Shurberg, 54, American attorney and politician.

21
Peter Doohan, 56, Australian tennis player, motor neurone disease.
Anne Dufourmantelle, 53, French philosopher, drowned.
Errol Dyers, 65, South African jazz guitarist and composer, emphysema.
Howard Eichenbaum, 69, American psychologist and neuroscientist, complications of spinal surgery.
Predrag Gojković Cune, 84, Serbian singer.
John Heard, 71, American actor (Home Alone, Big, Prison Break), heart attack.
Hasan Akbar Kamal, 71, Pakistani poet and writer.
Nikolay Kamenskiy, 85, Russian Olympic ski jumper (1960), world championship silver medalist (1962).
Yami Lester, 75, Australian Aboriginal and anti-nuclear activist.
Geoff Mack, 94, Australian country singer-songwriter ("I've Been Everywhere").
Jacques Nahum, 96, French television producer.
Lonnie "Bo" Pilgrim, 89, American businessman (Pilgrim's Pride).
Jon van Rood, 91, Dutch immunologist.
Hrvoje Šarinić, 82, Croatian politician, Prime Minister (1992–1993).
Kenny Shields, 69, Canadian singer (Streetheart), complications from heart surgery.
Stubbs, 20, American cat, honorary mayor of Talkeetna, Alaska (since 1997).
Soxie Topacio, 65, Filipino film director (Ded na si Lolo, Impostora) and LGBT activist (Quezon City Pride Council), lung cancer.
Gary Waller, 72, British politician, MP for Brighouse and Spenborough (1979–1983) and Keighley (1983–1997).
Deborah Watling, 69, English actress (Doctor Who, Take Me High, The Invisible Man), lung cancer.
Paapa Yankson, 73, Ghanaian highlife musician.
Clímaco Jacinto Zarauz Carrillo, 91, Ecuadorian Roman Catholic prelate, Bishop of Azogues (1990–2004).

22
Fergus Allen, 95, British civil servant and author.
Joyce Barnes, 91, American baseball player (AAGPBL).
Margo Chase, 59, American graphic designer (Buffy the Vampire Slayer), plane crash.
Piet Haan, 86, Dutch cyclist.
Fritz Hellwig, 104, German politician and bureaucrat, European Commissioner for Research, Technology and Information Distribution (1967–1970).
Polo Hofer, 72, Swiss musician.
Marcel Kunz, 74, Swiss footballer (Basel, national team).
Robert Loder, 83, English art collector.
Akbar Makhmoor, 61, Pakistani poet.
Edward Norfolk, 95, British Anglican priest, Archdeacon of St Albans (1982–1987).
Ernst Ottensamer, 62, Austrian clarinetist, heart attack.
Mathura Prasad Pal, 71, Indian politician, cancer.
Shivajirao Girdhar Patil, 92, Indian politician, Padma Bhushan (2013).
Rappin' Granny, 84, American rapper (America's Got Talent).
Haddon Robinson, 86, American author and academic, interim president of Gordon-Conwell Theological Seminary.
František Ševčík, 75, Czech ice hockey player (national team), Olympic silver medalist (1968).
Kostiantyn Sytnyk, 91, Ukrainian botanist and politician, Chairman of the Supreme Soviet of the Ukrainian SSR (1980–1985).
Artyom Tarasov, 67, Russian businessman and activist, first millionaire of the USSR.
Willie Townes, 74, American football player (Dallas Cowboys), heart attack.
Jim Vance, 75, American news anchor (WRC-TV), cancer.

23
Wenceslaus Anthony, 59, Indian-born New Zealand businessman.
Reginald Arnold, 92, Australian racing cyclist.
Thanasis Bebis, 88–89, Greek Olympic footballer (1952).
Yuri Belov, 88, Russian painter.
Elliott Castro, 68, Puerto Rican sports commentator and author, heart attack.
Dave Cogdill, 66, American politician, member of the California State Assembly (2000–2006) and Senate (2006–2010), pancreatic cancer.
Bob DeMoss, 90, American football player and coach (Purdue University).
Simon Doggart, 56, English head teacher and cricketer (Cambridge University).
Adebayo Faleti, 95, Nigerian actor, poet, journalist and writer.
Thomas Fleming, 90, American writer and historian (American Revolution).
Thomas Füri, 70, Swiss violinist (I Salonisti).
Robin Gardiner, 70, English writer and RMS Titanic conspiracy theorist.
Amir Fryszer Guttman, 41, Israeli singer, drowned.
John Kundla, 101, American Hall of Fame basketball coach (Minneapolis Lakers, University of Minnesota).
Lau Wong-fat, 80, Hong Kong businessman and politician, member of the Legislative Council (1986–2016) and Executive Council (2009–2012).
Jean-Pierre Le Bras, 86, French painter.
Tom Lister, 73, New Zealand rugby union player (South Canterbury, Wellington, national team).
Guennady Moisseev, 69, Russian motocross racer, world champion (1974, 1977, 1978).
Waldir Peres, 66, Brazilian footballer (São Paulo, Corinthians, national team), heart attack.
Mervyn Rose, 87, Australian Hall of Fame tennis player.
Jerry Rushing, 80, American bootlegger and actor, inspiration for The Dukes of Hazzard.
Snooty, 69, American manatee, mascot of Manatee County, Florida, drowned.
Flo Steinberg, 78, American comic book publisher (Big Apple Comix) and secretary (Marvel Comics), complications from a brain aneurysm and lung cancer.
Vladimir Stipetić, 89, Croatian economist and academician, rector of the University of Zagreb (1986–1989).
József Szendi, 95, Hungarian Roman Catholic prelate, Archbishop of Veszprém (1983–1997).

24
Domingo Alzugaray, 84, Argentine-born Brazilian actor and journalist, founder of ISTOÉ, complications of Alzheimer's disease.
B. R. Barwale, 86, Indian agronomist.
Giovanni Bianchi, 77, Italian politician, MP (1994–2006), President of the PPI (1994–1997).
Luis Gimeno, 90, Uruguayan-born Mexican actor (Mañana es para siempre).
Michiko Inukai, 96, Japanese writer and philanthropist.
Rajmata Mohinder Kaur of Patiala, 94, Indian royal and politician, MP (1967–1971).
Jørgen Kosmo, 69, Norwegian politician, member (1985–2005) and President of Parliament (2001–2005), Minister of Defence (1993–1997).
Michael Manktelow, 89, British Anglican prelate, Bishop of Basingstoke (1977–1993).
Naiyer Masud, 81, Indian Urdu short story writer.
Niculae Nedeff, 88, Romanian handball player and coach.
Yash Pal, 90, Indian scientist and educationist, Chairman of University Grants Commission (1986–1991), Padma Vibhushan (2013), lung cancer.
Udupi Ramachandra Rao, 85, Indian space scientist, Chairman of the Indian Space Research Organisation (1984–1994).
Øivind Solheim, 89, Norwegian Olympic ice hockey player (1952).

25
Hywel Bennett, 73, Welsh actor (The Virgin Soldiers, Shelley, EastEnders).
Gretel Bergmann, 103, German-born American high jumper.
Erzsébet Bognár, 75, Hungarian handball player, World champion (1965).
Sydney Cohen, 95, South African-born British pathologist.
Marian Diamond, 90, American neuroscientist.
Gabriel Epstein, 98, German-born British architect and urban planner.
Buddy Fletcher, 84, American politician, mayor of Lakeland, Florida (1993–2009), complications from a stroke.
Michael Johnson, 72, American singer ("Bluer Than Blue", "Give Me Wings", "The Moon Is Still Over Her Shoulder"), songwriter and guitarist.
Tarō Kimura, 52, Japanese politician, member of the House of Representatives (since 1996), pancreatic cancer.
Marian Konieczny, 87, Polish sculptor (Warsaw Nike).
Ivana Loudová, 76, Czech composer.
Rula Quawas, 57, Jordanian feminist academic, aortic rupture.
Luis María Ramírez Boettner, 99, Paraguayan lawyer and diplomat, Minister of Foreign Affairs (1993–1996).
Barbara Sinatra, 90, American fashion model, showgirl and philanthropist.
Billy Joe Walker Jr., 65, American guitarist and songwriter ("I Wanna Dance with You", "That's Why I Fell in Love with You", "B-B-B-Burnin' Up with Love").
John Wraw, 58, British Anglican prelate, Bishop of Bradwell (since 2012), multiple myeloma.
Geoffrey Gurrumul Yunupingu, 46, Australian Indigenous musician.
Jean-Pierre-Dominique Zévaco, 91, French-born Malagasy Roman Catholic prelate, Bishop of Tôlagnaro (1968−2001).

26
Paul Angerer, 90, Austrian conductor, violist, composer, and radio presenter.
Magnus Böcker, 55, Swedish businessman (OMX, Singapore Exchange, Dustin), cancer.
Robin Brock-Hollinshead, 88, British Olympic skier.
Cool "Disco" Dan, 47, American graffiti artist, complications from diabetes.
Patti Deutsch, 73, American comedian, game show panelist and voice actress (Rowan and Martin's Laugh-in, Match Game, The Emperor's New Groove), cancer.
June Foray, 99, American voice actress (The Rocky and Bullwinkle Show, Looney Tunes, Cinderella), cardiac arrest.
Leo Kinnunen, 73, Finnish racing driver (Interserie, Nordic Challenge Cup, Formula One).
Hervé Le Roux, 59, French film critic and director.
K. E. Mammen, 95, Indian activist.
Frank Otto, 80, American academic.
Sergey Petrosyan, 29, Azerbaijani-born Russian weightlifter, European champion (2007, 2008), drowned.
Lawrence Pezzullo, 91, American diplomat, Ambassador to Uruguay (1977–79) and Nicaragua (1979–81).
Ronald Phillips, 43, American convicted murderer, execution by lethal injection.
Giovan Battista Pichierri, 74, Italian Roman Catholic prelate, Archbishop of Trani-Barletta-Bisceglie (since 1999).
Maxlei dos Santos Luzia, 42, Brazilian footballer (Botafogo, AA Portuguesa, Vila Nova), cerebral edema.
Keith Simons, 63, American football player (Kansas City Chiefs).
Lyle Smith, 101, American football coach (Boise State Broncos).
Helmut Thieltges, 61, German chef.
Joachim Vobbe, 70, German Old Catholic prelate, Bishop of the Old Catholics in Germany (1995–2009).
Peter Wende, 81, German historian.
Jimmy White, 75, English footballer (AFC Bournemouth, Portsmouth, Gillingham).
Ramón Xirau, 93, Spanish-born Mexican poet, philosopher and literary critic.

27
Johnny Brandon, 92, English singer and songwriter.
Cena N641, American Labrador retriever therapy and bomb detection dog, euthanized.
Perivaldo Dantas, 64, Brazilian footballer (Botafogo, São Paulo, national team), pneumonia.
John DeCamp, 76, American politician and lawyer.
Abdelmajid Dolmy, 64, Moroccan footballer (Raja Casablanca, Olympique de Casablanca, national team).
Michel Durafour, 97, French politician.
H. A. Hargreaves, 89, Canadian science fiction writer.
Stan Hart, 88, American comics and comedy writer (Mad), progressive supranuclear palsy.
Eustace John, 78, Nevisian politician, Deputy Governor-General (1992–2017).
Kim Weon-kee, 55, South Korean wrestler, Olympic gold medalist (1984), heart attack.
Cheri Maples, 64, American police officer and peace activist, infection.
Red Martin, 79, American Olympic ice hockey player (1964).
Valery Maslov, 77, Russian football and bandy player and coach, stroke.
D. L. Menard, 85, American Cajun musician.
Ovidio Messa, 64, Bolivian footballer, pancreatic cancer.
Mario Tullio Montano, 73, Italian fencer, Olympic champion (1972) and silver medalist (1976).
George B. Rabb, 87, American zoologist.
Manfred Rummel, 79, German football player and coach.
Manik Sanyal, 81, Indian politician.
Sam Shepard, 73, American playwright (Buried Child) and actor (The Right Stuff, Black Hawk Down), Pulitzer Prize winner (1979), complications from ALS.
Dharam Singh, 80, Indian politician, Chief Minister of Karnataka (2004–2006).
Marty Sklar, 83, American businessman (Walt Disney Imagineering).
Gilles Tremblay, 84, Canadian composer, professor at Conservatoire de musique du Québec à Montréal (since 1962).
Peter Wegner, 84, Austrian-born American computer scientist.

28
Samson Abioye, 26, Nigerian computer programmer.
Edward Allcard, 102, British architect and yachtsman.
Enzo Bettiza, 90, Yugoslav-born Italian novelist, journalist (Il Giornale) and politician, Senator (1976–1979) and MEP (1979–1994).
José Vicente Beviá Pastor, 83, Spanish politician, member (1979–2000) and Deputy Speaker of Congress of Deputies (1993–1996), Senator (1977–1979).
James Egan, 88, Australian artist.
Maurice Filion, 85, Canadian ice hockey executive and coach (Quebec Nordiques).
Runa Førde, 84, Norwegian painter and illustrator.
Charlie Gard, 11 months, British infant, subject of life support and parental rights case, MDDS.
Håvard Holm, 73, Norwegian civil servant.
Inder Kumar, 43, Indian actor (Wanted, Tumko Na Bhool Paayenge, Kahin Pyaar Na Ho Jaaye), heart attack.
Inga Lantz, 74, Swedish politician, MP (1973–1988).
Stein Mehren, 82, Norwegian poet, essayist and playwright.
Siegfried Meister, 78, German executive (Rational AG).
John G. Morris, 100, American photo editor (Life, The New York Times, Ladies' Home Journal).
Derek Nippard, 86, English football referee.
Gösta Peterson, 94, Swedish fashion photographer.
Mamy Rakotoarivelo, Malagasy politician, Minister of Communications (2002), shot.
Janet Sape, 58, Papua New Guinean netball player and sports administrator.
Rosemary Anne Sisson, 93, British author and scriptwriter.
Warren Keith Urbom, 91, American judge, Judge of the U.S. District Court for the District of Nebraska (1970–1990).

29
Eunice de Souza, 76, Indian poet and novelist.
Dave Grayson, 78, American football player (Oakland Raiders).
Sophie Huet, 64, French journalist (L'Aurore, Le Figaro).
Media Kashigar, 61, Iranian author and translator, pulmonary disease.
Werner Kirsch, 79, German Olympic boxer.
Redha Malek, 85, Algerian politician and diplomat, Prime Minister (1993–1994).
Charley Marouani, 90, Tunisian impresario and talent agent.
Georges Martin, 87, French automotive engineer.
Lee May, 74, American baseball player (Cincinnati Reds, Houston Astros, Baltimore Orioles), heart disease.
José Osvaldo de Meira Penna, 100, Brazilian diplomat and writer.
Yuri Alekseevich Ryzhov, 86, Soviet and Russian scientist and politician.
Olivier Strebelle, 90, Belgian sculptor.
Piotr S. Wandycz, 93, Polish-American historian, President of the Polish Institute of Arts and Sciences of America and professor emeritus (Yale University).
Stephen T. Worland, 94, American economist.

30
Tato Cifuentes, 91, Chilean comedian, actor, ventriloquist and singer, pneumonia.
Ciro Cirillo, 96, Italian politician and kidnapping victim, President of the Province of Naples (1969–1975) and Campania (1979–1980).
H. Sayeeduddin Dagar, 78, Indian Dhrupad singer.
Graham Foley, 94, English Anglican clergyman, Bishop of Reading (1982–1989).
Paulo Garcia, 58, Brazilian neurosurgeon and politician, Mayor of Goiânia (2010–2016), heart attack.
S. Nainar Kulasekaran, 92–93, Indian environmentalist.
Slim Mahfoudh, 75, Tunisian actor (L'Étoile du Nord).
Charlie Tagawa, 81, Japanese-born American banjoist.
Steadman Upham, 68, American archaeologist, college professor and president (University of Tulsa).
Anton Vratuša, 102, Slovenian politician and diplomat, Prime Minister (1978–1980) and Yugoslavia's ambassador to the United Nations (1967–1969).

31
Ray Albright, 83, American banker and politician, member of the Tennessee State Senate (1971–1994) and House of Representatives (1967–1971).
Nigel Beard, 80, British politician, MP for Bexleyheath and Crayford (1997–2005).
Jean-Claude Bouillon, 75, French comedian and actor (Child of the Night).
Alan Cameron, 79, British classicist and academic.
Max Day, 101, Australian ecologist.
Jérôme Golmard, 43, French tennis player, complications from ALS.
Francesco La Macchia, 78, Italian sprint canoeist, Olympic silver medalist (1960).
Roberto Lazzari, 79, Italian Olympic breaststroke swimmer (1960).
Peter Lewington, 67, English cricketer (Warwickshire, Berkshire).
*Liu Wen-hsiung, 62, Taiwanese politician, MLY (1999–2008), complications from a heart attack.
Chuck Loeb, 61, American jazz guitarist (Fourplay), cancer.
Tom Misson, 87, British Olympic racewalker (1960).
Jeanne Moreau, 89, French actress (Elevator to the Gallows, The Lovers, Jules and Jim).
Les Murray, 71, Hungarian-born Australian sports broadcaster (The World Game).
Michael O'Nan, 73, American mathematician.
Nancy Valentine, 89, American actress (The Black Castle).

References

2017-07
 07